Blastmycin is an antibiotic with the molecular formula C26H36N2O9 which is produced by the bacterium Streptomyces blastmyceticus.

References 

Antibiotics
Anilides
Lactones
Benzamides
Formamides